Harwood Dale is a village and civil parish in the Scarborough 
district of North Yorkshire, England. It lies within the North York Moors National Park. According to the 2001 UK census, Harwood Dale parish had a population of 134, which had risen to 140 at the 2011 Census, and remained at that number for an estimate by North Yorkshire County Council in 2015.

Governance
The parish council is Hackness and Harwood Dale Group Parish Council, which covers the six parishes of Broxa-cum-Troutsdale, Darncombe-cum-Langdale End, Hackness, Harwood Dale, Silpho and Suffield-cum-Everley.

Diarist
The ruined Chapel of St Margaret was built in memory of Margaret, Lady Hoby (1571–1633) of Hackness. She kept what is thought to be the oldest extant diary by a woman in English.

References

External links

Hackness & Harwood Dale Group Parish Council website 

Villages in North Yorkshire
Civil parishes in North Yorkshire